Cibusoides elegans is a species of benthonic foraminifera from the Pacific Ocean.

References

External links 

 Cibusoides elegans at the World Register of Marine Species (WoRMS)

Rotaliida
Species described in 1975